Robert Wallace McLachlan (9 March 1845 – 10 May 1926), was a prolific early Canadian numismatist, who published many works focusing primarily on pre-Canadian Confederation coins, tokens and medals. He lived in Montreal, and was for many years the Treasurer and Curator of The Canadian Antiquarian and Numismatic Journal. Along with fellow early Canadian numismatists Alfred Sandham, and P. N. Breton and Joseph Leroux, his publications are considered to have laid the foundations for Canadian numismatic research.

In 1894, P. N. Breton stated that McLachlan's coin collection was the most extensive in Canada with over 8,000 pieces, ranging from ancient Greek issues to contemporary coins. McLachlan sold his collection in its entirety to The Canadian Antiquarian and Numismatic Society of Montreal in 1922, which at that time had grown to an estimated 20,000 pieces.

McLachlan published the following books and pamphlets on Canadian tokens:
 The Edward Murphy Medal, published in 1877
 Canadian Temperance Medals, published in 1879
 The French-American Colonial Jettons, published in 1884 
 The Money and Medals of Canada Under the Old Regime, published in 1885
 Canadian Numismatics: A Descriptive Catalogue of Coins, Tokens and Medals Issued in or Relating to the Dominion of Canada and Newfoundland</i>, published in 1886
 Statistics of the Coinage for Canada and Newfoundland, published in 1890
 Canadian Communion Tokens, published in 1891
 The Louisbourg Medals</i>, published in 1891
 Annals of the Nova Scotian Currency, published in 1892
 Coins Struck in Canada Previous [to] 1840, published in 1892
 Canadian Diamond Jubilee Medals, published in 1898
 The Nova Scotian Treasury Notes, published in 1898
 Medals Awarded to the Canadian Indians, published in 1899
 Two Canadian Golden Wedding Medals, published in 1901
 The Real Date of the Canadian 1820 Harp Tokens, published in 1907

Notes

External links
 Annals of the Nova Scotian Currency on Archive.org
 Canadian Communion Tokens on Archive.org
 Canadian Diamond Jubilee Medals on Archive.org
 Canadian Numismatics: A Descriptive Catalogue of Coins, Tokens and Medals Issued in or Relating to the Dominion of Canada and Newfoundland on Archive.org
 Canadian Temperance Medals on Archive.org
 Coins Struck in Canada Previous [to] 1840 on Archive.org
 Medals Awarded to the Canadian Indians on Archive.org
 Statistics of the Coinage for Canada and Newfoundland on Archive.org
 The Edward Murphy Medal on Archive.org
 The French-American Colonial Jettons on Archive.org
 The Louisbourg Medals on Archive.org
 The Money and Medals of Canada Under the Old Regime on Archive.org
 The Nova Scotian Treasury Notes on Archive.org
 Two Canadian Golden Wedding Medals on Archive.org

Bibliography

External links

1845 births
1926 deaths
Canadian numismatists